Kangundo is a town in Kenya's Machakos County in the lower eastern region of Kenya.

Kangundo-Tala
Officially Kangundo-Tala's population is the 9th largest of any urban area in Kenya. Tala is part of Kangundo town council.

Towns in Machakos County

Nairobi Metro

Machakos County is within Greater Nairobi which consists of 4 out of 47 counties in Kenya but the area generates about 60% of the nations wealth. The counties are:
 Source: NairobiMetro/ Kenya Census

See also 
Tala
Machakos County

References 

Machakos County
Populated places in Eastern Province (Kenya)